Cathy Schulman (born 1965) is an American film producer.

A graduate of Yale University, Schulman's screen credits include Isn't She Great, Sidewalks of New York, Employee of the Month, Crash, The Illusionist, Darfur Now and Dark Places. She was the executive producer of the Lifetime TV series Angela's Eyes, which went on to be distributed worldwide.

The film Crash earned Schulman a nomination for the BAFTA Award for Best Film. She won the Academy Award for Best Picture as well as the Independent Spirit Award for Best First Film for the movie. She is the CEO and President of Welle Entertainment, a development and production company committed to producing film, television, and media that appeals to diverse audiences, with an emphasis on women and girls.

Filmography
She was a producer in all films unless otherwise noted.

Film

Production manager

Thanks

Television

References

External links

1965 births
Living people
American film producers
Yale University alumni
Producers who won the Best Picture Academy Award
Hackley School alumni